Khazar Mahmudov (born on 23 November 2000) is an Azerbaijani professional footballer who plays as a midfielder for Keşla in the Azerbaijan Premier League.

Club career
On 6 December 2019, Mahmudov made his debut in the Azerbaijan Premier League for Keşla match against Qarabağ.

References

External links
 

2000 births
Living people
Association football forwards
Azerbaijani footballers
Azerbaijan Premier League players
Shamakhi FK players
Sumgayit FK players